Robert Lumley (6 January 1933 – 25 February 2017) was an English professional footballer who played as an inside right in the Football League. He was born in Consett, County Durham.

Lumley died on 25 February 2017 at the age of 84.

References

External links

1933 births
2017 deaths
English footballers
Sportspeople from Consett
Footballers from County Durham
Charlton Athletic F.C. players
Hartlepool United F.C. players
Chesterfield F.C. players
Gateshead F.C. players
King's Lynn F.C. players
English Football League players
Association football forwards